The Brawn BGP 001 (originally known as the Honda RA109) is a Formula One world championship winning racing car, the design of which was started by Honda Racing, and completed and then built by the team after it was renamed to Brawn GP. It was the first and only Formula One car constructed by the Brawn GP team, and was used to contest the 2009 Formula One season. The car won eight out of the seventeen Grands Prix it competed in. It was notable for its unusual double diffuser, and its legality was disputed, though it was ultimately deemed legal by the FIA.

This is the first Brackley-based F1 car to utilize Mercedes-Benz engines, which is used by its successor factory team. On BGP 001's debut at the 2009 Australian Grand Prix, Jenson Button took pole position in qualifying and finished first in the race while his teammate Rubens Barrichello took second place in both qualifying and race.

Chassis

Honda Racing began development for their 2009 car early in the 2008 season. In December 2008, Honda announced their plans to withdraw from Formula One. Development of what would become the BGP 001 continued whilst a buyer was sought for the team. The team were purchased by Team Principal Ross Brawn, and the outfit renamed Brawn GP. It was designed by Loïc Bigois, in similar respects to all the other cars on the grid with a moulded carbon fibre and honeycomb composite monocoque and a front and rear wishbone and pushrod activated suspension system. Remarkably, it was revealed that the modifications made to the car to accommodate its Mercedes engine saw six inches removed from the rear end, severely compromising the car's center of gravity and by the time the team realized how much the car's balance had changed, there was no time to commission a new design. Ross Brawn also admitted that there were fundamental problems with the car, stating that it was too heavy, and that some of the parts were not good for the car.

Yet the car had one difference, which was focused on the rear so-called 'double-decker diffuser'. The diffuser is at the rear of the car and is a route to get downforce by using the airflow under the car's floor. The BGP 001 had a different central channel to its diffuser with the shape of the structure being used to create advanced type of double-decker design. The diffuser's controversial aspect was the hole in the rear which increases the speed of airflow as it heads towards the higher rear venturi section, where it expands and creates more downforce. Other teams argued that the presence of the hole was against the regulations.

At the first race of the season in Australia an official complaint was launched by Renault, Red Bull and Ferrari against the diffusers of the Williams FW31, Toyota TF109 and the BGP 001 saying that they were illegal. However the race stewards did not share that view and rejected the other teams' complaints. Subsequently, the car was cleared to race in Melbourne. The same problem was faced in Malaysia after BMW tried again but failed.

Over the controversy the 'non-diffuser' teams, Ferrari, BMW Sauber, Red Bull, lodged an official appeal against the design and the date was set for April 13, 2009 for the FIA International Court of appeal (ICA); putting the first two races under appeal meaning the cars' first two wins of the season with Button could have been removed. After discussing the legality of the diffusers throughout Tuesday a verdict was becoming clear. On Wednesday 14th the ICA concluded that the diffusers' designs were legal and complied with the 2009 regulations, rejecting the teams' appeal.

With the diffuser change, the new rules in place for the 2009 season required cars to have narrower and higher rear wings and wider and lower front wings, designed to reduce air disturbance for following cars and hence make overtaking easier. Slick tyres were also re-introduced in the 2009 Formula One season, having been absent since , this said to increase tyre grip by about 20%.

Engine and transmission 
The BGP 001 used a Mercedes-Benz FO108W engine, supplied through a customer deal. Per the 2009 regulations, the engine was a naturally aspirated V8 and was rev-limited to 18,000 rpm. Originally the car was engineered for a Honda-designed engine, however, when Honda announced their withdrawal from the sport, a customer deal with Mercedes was obtained. It was reported that deals with Ferrari and Mercedes were available, the latter being chosen as it was simpler to integrate into the existing car. However, an unnamed senior Brawn GP engineer, after the title-winning race in Brazil, was reported saying that significant and unconventional changes were made to accommodate the FO108W engine. Simon Cole, Brawn's chief trackside engineer, alluded that the team had decided against using Ferrari engines for fear that Ferrari would control the car's engine performance and not let a customer team beat them.

According to team CEO Nick Fry, the Mercedes engine was critical in the team's success, saying that it accounted for 50 percent of the team's upturn in performance and that they would not have won the championship with the Honda engines.

Unlike Mercedes's other customer Force India, which took supply of both the engine and a McLaren-designed transmission, the BGP 001 used a semi-automatic sequential transmission designed in-house at Brawn. This provided seven forward gears and one reverse gear, and was operated using two paddles located on the steering wheel. As with the engine installation, compromises were made with the gearbox. It did not sit in the ideal position because the crank-center height on the Mercedes engine was different from the Honda. Brawn did not opt to use the KERS system, which would have provided an extra  for up to 6.6 seconds a lap, due to the constraints such a device would place on the design of the car and the extra weight it would add. Ross Brawn had suggested that a KERS was not a high priority for the team.

Per the 2009 Formula One regulations, Brawn GP was limited to using eight engines per car throughout the season. The limited availability of engines led to a record being broken by the Brawn team; it was the first time one particular build of an engine had won three Grands Prix in succession.

Production numbers

Given the limited budget and development time, only three chassis were ever made (larger teams, such as McLaren build as many as eight): one for each driver and a spare. Due to the physical demands from reusing the same chassis to this extent, the condition of the chassis had deteriorated so much that the cars began to lose pace as the season progressed. The spare was used by Rubens Barrichello in Singapore, while Jenson Button used the second Brawn chassis BGP 001–02 in every practice, qualifying session and race between the 2009 Australian Grand Prix and the 2009 Brazilian Grand Prix. This meant that he won the championship in the oldest car on the grid. Chassis BGP 001-02 is owned by Ross Brawn and was demonstrated at the 2016 Goodwood Festival of Speed. Chassis 02 was painted silver after 2009 for the 2010 launch of Mercedes GP and used as a demonstration car for two years before being returned to its previous Brawn livery.

2009

Testing 

On the day of the BGP 001's debut, at Silverstone in the United Kingdom on March 6, 2009, Jenson Button performed the shakedown – the car featuring white, fluorescent yellow and black colours – ahead of a more comprehensive testing and development programme at the Circuit de Catalunya on March 9–12 and the Circuito de Jerez on March 15–18.

Brawn GP gave the BGP 001 its first test at the Circuit de Catalunya on 9 March 2009, topping the timesheets early on in the first session, eventually finishing the session in fourth. On day two, Rubens Barrichello took over and completed 111 laps, finishing third in the standings. This was followed by Button topping the timesheets on the third day by over a second clear of Felipe Massa's Ferrari, completing 130 laps. In response, Massa hailed the BGP 001 as the most competitive pre-season car, stating that he does not think anyone can top their times and that Ferrari is currently less competitive than Brawn GP. On the final day of the test, Barrichello replicated the feat of his teammate; topping the time sheets by over eight-tenths of a second from Nico Rosberg's Williams, completing 110 laps.

With the testing moving to Circuito de Jerez, Brawn continued to set the pace, six-tenths clear of Renault's Fernando Alonso, completing 107 laps. Alonso topped the timesheets on day two, edging Barrichello into second leaving Button third, as the drivers completed 74 laps between them. On the final day, Button topped once again, two-tenths clear of Rosberg with Nelson Piquet Jr. and Lewis Hamilton further behind.

The car's first race was at the Australian Grand Prix on March 29.

2009 season 

The car was used by Jenson Button and Rubens Barrichello for all 17 races of the 2009 season. It won the season opening  in the hands of Button, with Barrichello finishing second giving the BGP 001 a 1-2 finish on its debut, which had not happened since .

The car achieved podium finishes in all of the first 8 races of the season with Button winning 6 times, at the Australian, Malaysian, Bahrain, Spanish, Monaco and Turkish Grands Prix. In the latter half of the season, it only achieved two more wins (Valencia and Monza), both in Barrichello's hands.

The legality of the car's diffuser was disputed by other teams, but ultimately cleared by the FIA. At the first race of the season in Australia, an official complaint was launched by Renault, Red Bull and Ferrari against the diffusers of the Williams FW31, Toyota TF109 and the BGP 001 saying that they were illegal. However the race stewards did not share that view and rejected the other teams' complaints. Subsequently, the car was cleared to race in Melbourne.
There was an appeal launched on the 'diffuser cars' but was rejected by the FIA on Wednesday 14 April 2009 leaving the diffuser on the BGP 001 clear to race.

The reason the car struggled with tyre temperature is because it managed its tyres better in hotter climates but in colder climates this meant the car wasn't hard enough on the tyres to get the heat into them.

The win in Monaco marked the first time in Formula One history that the same engine had won three Grands Prix in succession.

The car suffered its first and only mechanical retirement at the  when Barrichello lost seventh gear.

Another notable incident occurred at the Hungarian GP, a suspension spring came off Barrichello's car during the third qualifying period and struck Felipe Massa's helmet that left the Ferrari driver briefly unconscious as he crashed head-on into a tyre barrier, sustaining a serious head injury.

Livery

When it was first run, the only logos covering the plain white body of the BGP 001 were those of Bridgestone and Brawn GP themselves. Gradually, as the team began earning sponsors, the car began filling up with logos – beginning with that of Henri Lloyd, and shortly followed by Virgin Group following their major sponsorship of the team. MIG Bank became a major sponsor and was advertised on the front of the BGP 001 for  eventually covering the front of the car by themselves.

At the 2009 Spanish Grand Prix, the car sported imagery and the logo of the film Terminator Salvation on its rear wing for the entirety of the race weekend.
Before the  the team signed Graham-London. Their logo was shown on the cars' wing mirrors. For the Singapore Grand Prix, Brawn GP secured a sponsorship deal with Canon. For the 2009 Brazilian Grand Prix Brawn GP closed a deal with Petrópolis brewery to stamp their colours and beer brand Itaipava on both cars.

Complete Formula One results 
(key) (results in bold indicate pole position; results in italics indicate fastest lap)

 Half points awarded as less than 75% of race distance completed.

Other 
On 18 June 2018, it was announced by Codemasters that this car would appear as a classic car in F1 2018.

References

External links 

2009 Formula One season cars
BGP 001
Formula One championship-winning cars